Poland has a rich selection of Gold and Silver commemorative coins. In the year 2004 coins were launched in the series: "Animals of the World", "Polish Kings and Princes", "Polish Travelers and Explorer", "The Polish Calendar of Traditional Customs and Rituals" and "Polish Painters of the Turn of 19th and 20th Centuries" and various occasional coins.

See also

 Numismatics
 Regular issue coinage
 Coin grading

References

Commemorative coins of Poland